Vance Veazey (born June 25, 1965) is an American professional golfer who has played on the PGA Tour and the Web.com Tour.

Veazey was born in Memphis, Tennessee. He graduated from the University of Mississippi in 1989 with a Bachelor of Business Administration degree. He turned pro in 1990.

Veazey has played on the Nationwide Tour (1995, 1999–2002, 2004–05 and 2007–09) and PGA Tour (1998, 2003 and 2006). While he has four wins on the Nationwide Tour, he has only one top-10 finish on the PGA Tour. He has also played on the NGA Hooters Tour where he has four wins.

In 2009, Veazey finished 23rd on the Nationwide Tour money list to earn his 2010 PGA Tour card.

Professional wins (8)

Nationwide Tour wins (4)

Nationwide Tour playoff record (2–1)

Other wins (4)
four NGA Hooters Tour wins

See also
1997 PGA Tour Qualifying School graduates
2002 PGA Tour Qualifying School graduates
2005 Nationwide Tour graduates
2009 Nationwide Tour graduates
List of golfers with most Web.com Tour wins

References

External links

American male golfers
Ole Miss Rebels men's golfers
PGA Tour golfers
Korn Ferry Tour graduates
Golfers from Memphis, Tennessee
1965 births
Living people